A number of steamships have been renamed Heminge, including –

, a British cargo ship in service 1946–48
, a British cargo ship in service 1919–40
, a British cargo ship in service 1955–56

Ship names